Cevizli is a village in the Kiraz district of the İzmir Province in Turkey.

References

Villages in İzmir Province
Kiraz District